Mulberry Grove is an unincorporated community in Harris County, in the U.S. state of Georgia.

History
A post office called Mulberry Grove was established in 1831, and remained in operation until 1904. The community was named for mulberry trees near the original town site.

References

Unincorporated communities in Harris County, Georgia